Radnashiri or Aradnashiri (Mongolian: Раднашири хатан) (died 1322) was an empress consort of the Yuan dynasty, married to Ayurbarwada Buyantu Khan (Emperor Renzong).

Life 
She was from the Khongirad tribe. It is not known when she met Ayurbarwada or his relation to any preceding empresses by blood. She gave birth to Shidibala on 22 February 1302. She became empress upon Ayurbarwada's elevation to throne in 1311. Her influence increased upon installment of Shidibala as the new crown prince but Dagi's influence strictly limited hers. She was created Empress Dowager in 1320 by his son, now Emperor Gegeen Khan. However, she soon died in 1322, around the very time Dagi fell from power as well. She was posthumously renamed Empress Zhuāngyìcí Shèng by Gegeen Khan and interred together with Ayurbarwada.

References 

Year of birth missing
1322 deaths
14th-century Mongolian women
Yuan dynasty empresses
14th-century Chinese women
14th-century Chinese people